Arnold Neustadter (25 August 1910 – 17 April 1996) was an American inventor and businessman. He invented the Rolodex desktop rotating card file and other office equipment with Danish engineer Hildaur Neilson, which has been called "a triumph of low technology" and "a lasting symbol of the art of networking".

Neustadter's earlier inventions included the Autodex, a spring-operated phone directory that automatically opened to the selected letter, Swivodex, an inkwell that did not spill, Punchodex, a paper hole puncher, and Clipodex, a transcription aid that attached to a stenographer's knee.

References

1910 births
1996 deaths
20th-century American inventors